Some Are Lakes is the first full-length album by Canadian indie rock band Land of Talk, released October 7, 2008, on Secret City Records in Canada and Saddle Creek Records in the United States.

The album was produced by Justin Vernon of the American indie folk group Bon Iver.

Track listing

Critical reception
In October 2008, David Bevan of Pitchfork gave the album a 6.9/10. With oral influence from bands Sonic Youth, Fleetwood Mac, and  Afghan Whigs, Bevan reports that "...while just as thorny and gnarled in parts...its calms are ultimately more haunting and compelling than its many storms."

References 

2008 debut albums
Land of Talk albums
Saddle Creek Records albums
Secret City Records albums